James Browne (15 June 1793 – 23 December 1854) was an Irish politician who was the son of Hon. Denis Browne, MP for County Mayo in 1801 and brother of Peter Browne, MP. He succeeded his father in the year 1828 and was elected in 1818 as Member of Parliament for Mayo, and held the seat until 1831.

James Brown married twice. His first wife being Eleanor Catherine, the daughter of John Wells of Bickley, Kent and hissecond wife being Elizabeth, the daughter of John Puget, a banker of Totteridge, Hertfordshire. Brown had a son and three daughters by Elizabeth.

References

External links 
 

1793 births
1854 deaths
Members of the Parliament of the United Kingdom for County Mayo constituencies (1801–1922)
UK MPs 1818–1820
UK MPs 1820–1826
UK MPs 1830–1831
Politicians from County Mayo